The cubic honeycomb or cubic cellulation is the only proper regular space-filling tessellation (or honeycomb) in Euclidean 3-space made up of cubic cells. It has 4 cubes around every edge, and 8 cubes around each vertex. Its vertex figure is a regular octahedron. It is a self-dual tessellation with Schläfli symbol {4,3,4}. John Horton Conway called this honeycomb a cubille.

Related honeycombs
It is part of a multidimensional family of hypercube honeycombs, with Schläfli symbols of the form {4,3,...,3,4}, starting with the square tiling, {4,4} in the plane.

It is one of 28 uniform honeycombs using convex uniform polyhedral cells.

Isometries of simple cubic lattices
Simple cubic lattices can be distorted into lower symmetries, represented by lower crystal systems:

Uniform colorings 

There is a large number of uniform colorings, derived from different symmetries. These include:

Projections 
The cubic honeycomb can be orthogonally projected into the euclidean plane with various symmetry arrangements. The highest (hexagonal) symmetry form projects into a triangular tiling. A square symmetry projection forms a square tiling.

Related polytopes and honeycombs
It is related to the regular 4-polytope tesseract, Schläfli symbol {4,3,3}, which exists in 4-space, and only has 3 cubes around each edge. It's also related to the order-5 cubic honeycomb, Schläfli symbol {4,3,5}, of hyperbolic space with 5 cubes around each edge.

It is in a sequence of polychora and honeycombs with octahedral vertex figures.

It in a sequence of regular polytopes and honeycombs with cubic cells.

Related polytopes 
The cubic honeycomb has a lower symmetry as a runcinated cubic honeycomb, with two sizes of cubes. A double symmetry construction can be constructed by placing a small cube into each large cube, resulting in a nonuniform honeycomb with cubes, square prisms, and rectangular trapezoprisms (a cube with D2d symmetry). Its vertex figure is a triangular pyramid with its lateral faces augmented by tetrahedra.

Dual cell

The resulting honeycomb can be alternated to produce another nonuniform honeycomb with regular tetrahedra, two kinds of tetragonal disphenoids, triangular pyramids, and sphenoids. Its vertex figure has C3v symmetry and has 26 triangular faces, 39 edges, and 15 vertices.

Related Euclidean tessellations 
The [4,3,4], Coxeter group generates 15 permutations of uniform tessellations, 9 with distinct geometry including the alternated cubic honeycomb. The expanded cubic honeycomb (also known as the runcinated cubic honeycomb) is geometrically identical to the cubic honeycomb.

The [4,31,1], Coxeter group generates 9 permutations of uniform tessellations, 4 with distinct geometry including the alternated cubic honeycomb.

This honeycomb is one of five distinct uniform honeycombs constructed by the  Coxeter group. The symmetry can be multiplied by the symmetry of rings in the Coxeter–Dynkin diagrams:

Rectified cubic honeycomb

The rectified cubic honeycomb or rectified cubic cellulation is a uniform space-filling tessellation (or honeycomb) in Euclidean 3-space.  It is composed of octahedra and cuboctahedra in a ratio of 1:1, with a square prism vertex figure.

John Horton Conway calls this honeycomb a cuboctahedrille, and its dual an oblate octahedrille.

Projections 
The rectified cubic honeycomb can be orthogonally projected into the euclidean plane with various symmetry arrangements.

Symmetry 
There are four uniform colorings for the cells of this honeycomb with reflective symmetry, listed by their Coxeter group, and Wythoff construction name, and the Coxeter diagram below.

This honeycomb can be divided on trihexagonal tiling planes, using the hexagon centers of the cuboctahedra, creating two triangular cupolae. This scaliform honeycomb is represented by Coxeter diagram , and symbol s3{2,6,3}, with coxeter notation symmetry [2+,6,3].
 .

Related polytopes 
A double symmetry construction can be made by placing octahedra on the cuboctahedra, resulting in a nonuniform honeycomb with two kinds of octahedra (regular octahedra and triangular antiprisms). The vertex figure is a square bifrustum. The dual is composed of elongated square bipyramids.

Dual cell

Truncated cubic honeycomb 

The truncated cubic honeycomb or truncated cubic cellulation is a uniform space-filling tessellation (or honeycomb) in Euclidean 3-space.  It is composed of truncated cubes and octahedra in a ratio of 1:1, with an isosceles square pyramid vertex figure.

John Horton Conway calls this honeycomb a truncated cubille, and its dual pyramidille.

Projections 
The truncated cubic honeycomb can be orthogonally projected into the euclidean plane with various symmetry arrangements.

Symmetry 

There is a second uniform coloring by reflectional symmetry of the Coxeter groups, the second seen with alternately colored truncated cubic cells.

Related polytopes 
A double symmetry construction can be made by placing octahedra on the truncated cubes, resulting in a nonuniform honeycomb with two kinds of octahedra (regular octahedra and triangular antiprisms) and two kinds of tetrahedra (tetragonal disphenoids and digonal disphenoids). The vertex figure is an octakis square cupola.

Vertex figure

Dual cell

Bitruncated cubic honeycomb

The bitruncated cubic honeycomb is a space-filling tessellation (or honeycomb) in Euclidean 3-space made up of truncated octahedra (or, equivalently, bitruncated cubes). It has four truncated octahedra around each vertex, in a tetragonal disphenoid vertex figure. Being composed entirely of truncated octahedra, it is cell-transitive. It is also edge-transitive, with 2 hexagons and one square on each edge, and vertex-transitive. It is one of 28 uniform honeycombs.

John Horton Conway calls this honeycomb a truncated octahedrille in his Architectonic and catoptric tessellation list, with its dual called an oblate tetrahedrille, also called a disphenoid tetrahedral honeycomb. Although a regular tetrahedron can not tessellate space alone, this dual has identical disphenoid tetrahedron cells with isosceles triangle faces.

Projections 
The bitruncated cubic honeycomb can be orthogonally projected into the euclidean plane with various symmetry arrangements. The highest (hexagonal) symmetry form projects into a nonuniform rhombitrihexagonal tiling. A square symmetry projection forms two overlapping truncated square tiling, which combine together as a chamfered square tiling.

Symmetry 
The vertex figure for this honeycomb is a disphenoid tetrahedron, and it is also the Goursat tetrahedron (fundamental domain) for the  Coxeter group. This honeycomb has four uniform constructions, with the truncated octahedral cells having different Coxeter groups and Wythoff constructions.  These uniform symmetries can be represented by coloring differently the cells in each construction.

Related polytopes 
Nonuniform variants with [4,3,4] symmetry and two types of truncated octahedra can be doubled by placing the two types of truncated octahedra to produce a nonuniform honeycomb with truncated octahedra and hexagonal prisms (as ditrigonal trapezoprisms). Its vertex figure is a C2v-symmetric triangular bipyramid.

This honeycomb can then be alternated to produce another nonuniform honeycomb with pyritohedral icosahedra, octahedra (as triangular antiprisms), and tetrahedra (as sphenoids). Its vertex figure has C2v symmetry and consists of 2 pentagons, 4 rectangles, 4 isosceles triangles (divided into two sets of 2), and 4 scalene triangles.

Alternated bitruncated cubic honeycomb

The alternated bitruncated cubic honeycomb or bisnub cubic honeycomb is non-uniform, with the highest symmetry construction reflecting an alternation of the uniform bitruncated cubic honeycomb. A lower-symmetry construction involves regular icosahedra paired with golden icosahedra (with 8 equilateral triangles paired with 12 golden triangles). These have symmetry [4,3+,4], [4,(31,1)+] and [3[4]]+ respectively. The first and last symmetry can be doubled as [[4,3+,4]] and [[3[4]]]+.

This honeycomb is represented in the boron atoms of the α-rhombohedral crystal. The centers of the icosahedra are located at the fcc positions of the lattice.

Cantellated cubic honeycomb

The cantellated cubic honeycomb or cantellated cubic cellulation is a uniform space-filling tessellation (or honeycomb) in Euclidean 3-space.  It is composed of rhombicuboctahedra, cuboctahedra, and cubes in a ratio of 1:1:3, with a wedge vertex figure.

John Horton Conway calls this honeycomb a 2-RCO-trille, and its dual quarter oblate octahedrille.

Images

Projections 
The cantellated cubic honeycomb can be orthogonally projected into the euclidean plane with various symmetry arrangements.

Symmetry 

There is a second uniform colorings by reflectional symmetry of the Coxeter groups, the second seen with alternately colored rhombicuboctahedral cells.

Related polytopes 
A double symmetry construction can be made by placing cuboctahedra on the rhombicuboctahedra, which results in the rectified cubic honeycomb, by taking the triangular antiprism gaps as regular octahedra, square antiprism pairs and zero-height tetragonal disphenoids as components of the cuboctahedron. Other variants result in cuboctahedra, square antiprisms, octahedra (as triangular antipodiums), and tetrahedra (as tetragonal disphenoids), with a vertex figure topologically equivalent to a cube with a triangular prism attached to one of its square faces.

Quarter oblate octahedrille
The dual of the cantellated cubic honeycomb is called a quarter oblate octahedrille, a catoptric tessellation with Coxeter diagram , containing faces from two of four hyperplanes of the cubic [4,3,4] fundamental domain.

It has irregular triangle bipyramid cells which can be seen as 1/12 of a cube, made from the cube center, 2 face centers, and 2 vertices.

Cantitruncated cubic honeycomb 

The cantitruncated cubic honeycomb or cantitruncated cubic cellulation is a uniform space-filling tessellation (or honeycomb) in Euclidean 3-space, made up of truncated cuboctahedra, truncated octahedra, and cubes in a ratio of 1:1:3, with a mirrored sphenoid vertex figure.

John Horton Conway calls this honeycomb a n-tCO-trille, and its dual triangular pyramidille.

Images
Four cells exist around each vertex:

Projections 
The cantitruncated cubic honeycomb can be orthogonally projected into the euclidean plane with various symmetry arrangements.

Symmetry 

Cells can be shown in two different symmetries. The linear Coxeter diagram form can be drawn with one color for each cell type. The bifurcating diagram form can be drawn with two types (colors) of truncated cuboctahedron cells alternating.

Triangular pyramidille

The dual of the cantitruncated cubic honeycomb is called a triangular pyramidille, with Coxeter diagram, . This honeycomb cells represents the fundamental domains of   symmetry.

A cell can be as 1/24 of a translational cube with vertices positioned: taking two corner, ne face center, and the cube center. The edge colors and labels specify how many cells exist around the edge.

Related polyhedra and honeycombs
It is related to a skew apeirohedron with vertex configuration 4.4.6.6, with the octagons and some of the squares removed. It can be seen as constructed by augmenting truncated cuboctahedral cells, or by augmenting alternated truncated octahedra and cubes.

Related polytopes 
A double symmetry construction can be made by placing truncated octahedra on the truncated cuboctahedra, resulting in a nonuniform honeycomb with truncated octahedra, hexagonal prisms (as ditrigonal trapezoprisms), cubes (as square prisms), triangular prisms (as C2v-symmetric wedges), and tetrahedra (as tetragonal disphenoids). Its vertex figure is topologically equivalent to the octahedron.

Vertex figure

Dual cell

Alternated cantitruncated cubic honeycomb 

Despite being non-uniform, there is a near-miss version with two edge lengths shown below, one of which is around 4.3% greater than the other. The snub cubes in this case are uniform, but the rest of the cells are not.

Cantic snub cubic honeycomb 

The cantic snub cubic honeycomb is constructed by snubbing the truncated octahedra in a way that leaves only rectangles from the cubes (square prisms). It is not uniform but it can be represented as Coxeter diagram . It has rhombicuboctahedra (with Th symmetry), icosahedra (with Th symmetry), and triangular prisms (as C2v-symmetry wedges) filling the gaps.

Related polytopes 
A double symmetry construction can be made by placing icosahedra on the rhombicuboctahedra, resulting in a nonuniform honeycomb with icosahedra, octahedra (as triangular antiprisms), triangular prisms (as C2v-symmetric wedges), and square pyramids.

Vertex figure

Dual cell

Runcitruncated cubic honeycomb 

The runcitruncated cubic honeycomb or runcitruncated cubic cellulation is a uniform space-filling tessellation (or honeycomb) in Euclidean 3-space.  It is composed of rhombicuboctahedra, truncated cubes, octagonal prisms, and cubes in a ratio of 1:1:3:3, with an isosceles-trapezoidal pyramid vertex figure.

Its name is derived from its Coxeter diagram,  with three ringed nodes representing 3 active mirrors in the Wythoff construction from its relation to the regular cubic honeycomb.

John Horton Conway calls this honeycomb a 1-RCO-trille, and its dual square quarter pyramidille.

Projections 
The runcitruncated cubic honeycomb can be orthogonally projected into the euclidean plane with various symmetry arrangements.

Related skew apeirohedron
Two related uniform skew apeirohedrons exists with the same vertex arrangement, seen as boundary cells from a subset of cells. One has triangles and squares, and the other triangles, squares, and octagons.

Square quarter pyramidille 
The dual to the runcitruncated cubic honeycomb is called a square quarter pyramidille, with Coxeter diagram . Faces exist in 3 of 4 hyperplanes of the [4,3,4],  Coxeter group.

Cells are irregular pyramids and can be seen as 1/24 of a cube, using one corner, one mid-edge point, two face centers, and the cube center.

Related polytopes 
A double symmetry construction can be made by placing rhombicuboctahedra on the truncated cubes, resulting in a nonuniform honeycomb with rhombicuboctahedra, octahedra (as triangular antiprisms), cubes (as square prisms), two kinds of triangular prisms (both C2v-symmetric wedges), and tetrahedra (as digonal disphenoids). Its vertex figure is topologically equivalent to the augmented triangular prism.

Vertex figure

Dual cell

Omnitruncated cubic honeycomb

The omnitruncated cubic honeycomb or omnitruncated cubic cellulation is a uniform space-filling tessellation (or honeycomb) in Euclidean 3-space.  It is composed of truncated cuboctahedra and octagonal prisms in a ratio of 1:3, with a phyllic disphenoid vertex figure.

John Horton Conway calls this honeycomb a b-tCO-trille, and its dual eighth pyramidille.

Projections 
The omnitruncated cubic honeycomb can be orthogonally projected into the euclidean plane with various symmetry arrangements.

Symmetry 

Cells can be shown in two different symmetries. The Coxeter diagram form has two colors of truncated cuboctahedra and octagonal prisms. The symmetry can be doubled by relating the first and last branches of the Coxeter diagram, which can be shown with one color for all the truncated cuboctahedral and octagonal prism cells.

Related polyhedra 
Two related uniform skew apeirohedron exist with the same vertex arrangement. The first has octagons removed, and vertex configuration 4.4.4.6. It can be seen as truncated cuboctahedra and octagonal prisms augmented together. The second can be seen as augmented octagonal prisms, vertex configuration 4.8.4.8.

Related polytopes 
Nonuniform variants with [4,3,4] symmetry and two types of truncated cuboctahedra can be doubled by placing the two types of truncated cuboctahedra on each other to produce a nonuniform honeycomb with truncated cuboctahedra, octagonal prisms, hexagonal prisms (as ditrigonal trapezoprisms), and two kinds of cubes (as rectangular trapezoprisms and their C2v-symmetric variants). Its vertex figure is an irregular triangular bipyramid.

Vertex figure

Dual cell

This honeycomb can then be alternated to produce another nonuniform honeycomb with snub cubes, square antiprisms, octahedra (as triangular antiprisms), and three kinds of tetrahedra (as tetragonal disphenoids, phyllic disphenoids, and irregular tetrahedra).

Vertex figure

Alternated omnitruncated cubic honeycomb 

An alternated omnitruncated cubic honeycomb or omnisnub cubic honeycomb can be constructed by alternation of the omnitruncated cubic honeycomb, although it can not be made uniform, but it can be given Coxeter diagram:  and has symmetry [[4,3,4]]+. It makes snub cubes from the truncated cuboctahedra, square antiprisms from the octagonal prisms, and creates new tetrahedral cells from the gaps.

Dual alternated omnitruncated cubic honeycomb 

A dual alternated omnitruncated cubic honeycomb is a space-filling honeycomb constructed as the dual of the alternated omnitruncated cubic honeycomb.

24 cells fit around a vertex, making a chiral octahedral symmetry that can be stacked in all 3-dimensions:

Individual cells have 2-fold rotational symmetry. In 2D orthogonal projection, this looks like a mirror symmetry.

Runcic cantitruncated cubic honeycomb 

The runcic cantitruncated cubic honeycomb or runcic cantitruncated cubic cellulation is constructed by removing alternating long rectangles from the octagons and is not uniform, but it can be represented as Coxeter diagram . It has rhombicuboctahedra (with Th symmetry), snub cubes, two kinds of cubes: square prisms and rectangular trapezoprisms (topologically equivalent to a cube but with D2d symmetry), and triangular prisms (as C2v-symmetry wedges) filling the gaps.

Biorthosnub cubic honeycomb 

The biorthosnub cubic honeycomb is constructed by removing alternating long rectangles from the octagons orthogonally and is not uniform, but it can be represented as Coxeter diagram . It has rhombicuboctahedra (with Th symmetry) and two kinds of cubes: square prisms and rectangular trapezoprisms (topologically equivalent to a cube but with D2d symmetry).

Truncated square prismatic honeycomb

The truncated square prismatic honeycomb or tomo-square prismatic cellulation is a space-filling tessellation (or honeycomb) in Euclidean 3-space.  It is composed of octagonal prisms and cubes in a ratio of 1:1.

It is constructed from a truncated square tiling extruded into prisms.

It is one of 28 convex uniform honeycombs.

Snub square prismatic honeycomb

The snub square prismatic honeycomb or simo-square prismatic cellulation is a space-filling tessellation (or honeycomb) in Euclidean 3-space.  It is composed of cubes and triangular prisms in a ratio of 1:2.

It is constructed from a snub square tiling extruded into prisms.

It is one of 28 convex uniform honeycombs.

Snub square antiprismatic honeycomb 

A snub square antiprismatic honeycomb can be constructed by alternation of the truncated square prismatic honeycomb, although it can not be made uniform, but it can be given Coxeter diagram:  and has symmetry [4,4,2,∞]+. It makes square antiprisms from the octagonal prisms, tetrahedra (as tetragonal disphenoids) from the cubes, and two tetrahedra from the triangular bipyramids.

See also 

Architectonic and catoptric tessellation
Alternated cubic honeycomb
List of regular polytopes
 Order-5 cubic honeycomb A hyperbolic cubic honeycomb with 5 cubes per edge
 voxel

References 

 John H. Conway, Heidi Burgiel, Chaim Goodman-Strauss, (2008) The Symmetries of Things,  (Chapter 21, Naming the Archimedean and Catalan polyhedra and tilings, Architectonic and Catoptric tessellations, p 292-298, includes all the nonprismatic forms)
 Coxeter, H.S.M. Regular Polytopes, (3rd edition, 1973), Dover edition,  p. 296, Table II: Regular honeycombs
 George Olshevsky, Uniform Panoploid Tetracombs, Manuscript (2006) (Complete list of 11 convex uniform tilings, 28 convex uniform honeycombs, and 143 convex uniform tetracombs)
 Branko Grünbaum, Uniform tilings of 3-space. Geombinatorics 4(1994), 49 - 56.
 Kaleidoscopes: Selected Writings of H.S.M. Coxeter, edited by F. Arthur Sherk, Peter McMullen, Anthony C. Thompson, Asia Ivic Weiss, Wiley-Interscience Publication, 1995,  
 (Paper 22) H.S.M. Coxeter, Regular and Semi Regular Polytopes I, [Math. Zeit. 46 (1940) 380-407, MR 2,10] (1.9 Uniform space-fillings)
 A. Andreini, Sulle reti di poliedri regolari e semiregolari e sulle corrispondenti reti correlative (On the regular and semiregular nets of polyhedra and on the corresponding correlative nets), Mem. Società Italiana della Scienze, Ser.3, 14 (1905) 75–129.
 
 Uniform Honeycombs in 3-Space: 01-Chon

Honeycombs (geometry)
4-polytopes
Self-dual tilings
Regular tessellations